Critter Crunch is a puzzle game in the vein of Magical Drop by Capybara Games for mobile phone platforms BREW and J2ME in 2007. It was later ported to iOS, PlayStation 3 on the PlayStation Network, Windows, and Mac OS X.

In Critter Crunch, players assume the role of Biggs, a friendly, furry forest dweller with an unending hunger for tasty critters. Using his long tongue, Biggs must set the food chain in motion by launching smaller critters into the waiting mouths of larger ones, clearing the screen and filling his belly.

Reception
The game was given positive reviews. It has an average of 78% at Game Rankings and a 87/100 at Metacritic. It won Best Game of 2007 at the Independent Games Festival Mobile.

Review Scores
1UP: 9.5/10
IGN: 8.6/10

References

Notes

External links
Critter Crunch at CapybaraGames.com
Interview with Capybara Games about Critter Crunch at Console-Arcade.com

2007 video games
Disney video games
IOS games
J2ME games
MacOS games
PlayStation 3 games
PlayStation Network games
Puzzle video games
Video games developed in Canada
Windows games

Multiplayer and single-player video games
PhyreEngine games
Capybara Games games